Stewart Lake is a lake that is located north of Wheelerville, New York. Fish species present in the lake are brook trout, and sunfish. There is carry down access via trail off Green Lake Road on the southeast shore.

References

Lakes of New York (state)
Lakes of Fulton County, New York